Commissioner for Transport may refer to:
 European Commissioner for Transport
 Commissioner for Transport (Hong Kong), head of the Hong Kong Transport Department